Chionodes bardus is a moth in the family Gelechiidae. It is found in North America, where it has been recorded from California and Washington.

The larvae feed on Eriogonum giganteum and Eriogonum grande.

References

Chionodes
Moths described in 1999
Moths of North America